Woollensbrook is a hamlet in Hertfordshire, England. It is in the town of Hoddesdon.

Hamlets in Hertfordshire
Hoddesdon